Super scription of data is the 5th single of J-pop singer Eiko Shimamiya. The title track was used as the opening theme for Higurashi no Naku Koro ni Rei,  having made this Shimamiya's fifth and last tie-in with the series.

This single's catalog number is FCCM-267 and it came in a regular CD only edition.

Track listing 

Super scription of data—4:35
Lyrics: Eiko Shimamiya
Composition/Arrangement: Kazuya Takase
electric universe—5:44
Lyrics: Eiko Shimamiya
Composition/Arrangement: SORMA No.1
Super scription of data (instrumental) -- 4:35
electric universe (instrumental) -- 5:41

Charts 

Total sales: 3,915

References

2009 singles
2009 songs
Eiko Shimamiya songs